Livin' on a High Note is the tenth solo studio album by American musician Mavis Staples. It was released in February 2016 under Epitaph. Rolling Stone placed the album on its 45 Best Albums of 2016 So Far list.

Track listing

References

2016 albums
Mavis Staples albums
Epitaph Records albums